Neostichtis is a genus of moths of the family Noctuidae. The genus was erected by Anthonie Johannes Theodorus Janse in 1937.

Species
Neostichtis altitudinis Laporte, 1972 Cameroon
Neostichtis fulgurata Carcasson, 1965 Tanzania
Neostichtis ignorata Viette, 1957 Madagascar
Neostichtis inopinatus Viette, 1959 Madagascar
Neostichtis nigricostata (Hampson, 1908) Sierra Leone, Mauritius
Neostichtis teruworkae Laporte, 1984 Ethiopia

References

Amphipyrinae
Moth genera